Messias Filipe Santos Baptista (born 25 June 1999) is a Portuguese sprint canoeist. He competed in the men's K-4 500 metres event at the 2020 Summer Olympics.

References

External links
 

1999 births
Living people
People from Vila do Conde
Portuguese male canoeists
S.L. Benfica (canoeing)
Olympic canoeists of Portugal
Canoeists at the 2020 Summer Olympics
ICF Canoe Sprint World Championships medalists in kayak
Sportspeople from Porto District